Yau Yue Wan Village is a village in the Po Lam area of Tseung Kwan O, in the Sai Kung District of Hong Kong.

Administration
Yau Yue Wan is a recognized village under the New Territories Small House Policy.

History
At the time of the 1911 census, the population of Yau Yue Wan was 116. The number of males was 53.

References

External links

 Delineation of area of existing village Yau Yue Wan (Hang Hau) for election of resident representative (2019 to 2022)

Tseung Kwan O
Villages in Sai Kung District, Hong Kong